The Government of Madhesh Province, known locally as the Province Government, is the supreme governing authority of the Nepalese province of Madhesh Province which consists of 8 districts.

The Governor of the province is appointed head of the province by the President of Nepal on the recommendation of Federal cabinet for a period of five years unless freed earlier by federal government. The Head of Province is the Governor and the Chief Minister holds the position of the Head of executive. The role of governor is largely ceremonial as the functioning of the government is managed entirely by the Chief Minister. The governor appoints minister and chief minister based on the articles and clauses of Constitution. 

The province government maintains its capital at Janakpur and is seated at the Madhesh Province Provincial Government Secretariat.

Background
The Government of Province No. 2 was formed on February 4, 2018 after the 2017 Nepalese provincial elections. The present legislative structure of Province No. 2 is Unicameral and consists of 107 legislative members (64 members are elected through FPTP and 43 are elected through PR). The normal term of the provincial assembly is five years, unless dissolved earlier.

Executive 

 Governor : Hari Shankar Mishra
 Chief Minister : Saroj Kumar Yadav

Legislature

 Speaker of Provincial Assembly of Madhesh Province: Vacant

The province is governed by a parliamentary system of representative democracy. The legislative structure of the province is unicameral. The Provincial Assembly of Madhesh Province consists of 107 members who are elected for five-year terms. The province contributes 32 seats to the lower house of the Parliament of Nepal, the House of Representatives and 8 seats to the upper house, the National Assembly.

Judiciary 

 Chief Justice of Janakpur High Court : Binod Sharma (Acting)

References

External links
 

Government of Madhesh Province
Madhesh Province